The Kelley House is a historic building located in Dubuque, Iowa, United States.  John and Mary Kelley bought this property from James Fanning in 1855.  Kelley built this two-story structure, which is a rare example of Mississippi Valley French Colonial architecture in Iowa.  While Kelley was not of French ancestry, the Dubuque area was initially settled by French Canadians.  However, this house, completed by 1858, was completed well after the French influence in the area.  It is also an example of the French style from the Southern United States and the Caribbean.  Typical of this style is the full-length galerie, or porch, with an exterior staircase, and the main living quarters located above a full-height ground floor level. Both of these elements are found in the Kelley house.  It was listed on the National Register of Historic Places in 1978.

References

Houses completed in 1855
French colonial architecture
Houses in Dubuque, Iowa
National Register of Historic Places in Dubuque, Iowa
Houses on the National Register of Historic Places in Iowa